Grand Prix cycliste de Gatineau is an elite women's professional road race held in Canada and is currently rated by the Union Cycliste Internationale (UCI) as a 1.1 race. In the same week the Chrono Gatineau, an individual time trial event, is held.

Past winners

References

External links 

Cycle races in Canada
Women's road bicycle races